Christian Blake (born June 8, 1996) is an American football wide receiver who is a free agent. He played college football at Northern Illinois.

Professional career

Atlanta Falcons
Blake signed with the Atlanta Falcons as an undrafted free agent on May 1, 2018. He was waived on September 1, 2018. He was re-signed to the practice squad on September 10, 2018. He was released on September 26, 2018. He was re-signed to the practice squad on December 18, 2018. He signed a reserve/future contract with the Falcons on December 31, 2018.

On August 31, 2019, Blake was waived by the Falcons and was signed to the practice squad the next day. He was promoted to the active roster on October 23, 2019.

Blake signed a contract extension with the Falcons on March 11, 2021.

Arizona Cardinals
On May 16, 2022, Blake signed with the Arizona Cardinals. He was waived on August 2, 2022.

Pittsburgh Steelers
On August 11, 2022, Blake signed with the Pittsburgh Steelers. He was released on August 23, 2022.

References

External links
Atlanta Falcons bio
Northern Illinois Huskies bio

1996 births
Living people
American football wide receivers
Arizona Cardinals players
Atlanta Falcons players
Northern Illinois Huskies football players
Players of American football from Fort Lauderdale, Florida